is one of the 16 wards of the city of Nagoya in Aichi Prefecture, Japan. , the ward had an estimated population of 164,522, and a population density of 7,624 persons per km².

Geography
Tempaku Ward is located in eastern Nagoya city.

Surrounding municipalities
Shōwa Ward
Chikusa Ward
Mizuho Ward
Meitō Ward
Midori Ward
Minami Ward
Nisshin

History
The area of present Tempaku District has strong connections with the Oda clan and was a frequently battlefield in the Sengoku period. During the Edo period, it was largely part of Owari Domain under the Tokugawa shogunate. The modern village of Tempaku was established in 1906 within Aichi District.  It was annexed by the city of Nagoya in 1955, becoming part of Showa District. In 1975, Showa District was divided into the new Showa District and Tempaku District.

Education
Meijo University
Tokai Gakuen University – Nagoya campus
Toyota Technological Institute
Nagoya Women's University – Tempaku campus, which was closed in 2015 and integrated into Shioji Campus at Mizuho-ku (See Nagoya Women's University#History ).
Tempaku Ward has one elementary, two middle and three high schools.

Transportation

Railway
Nagoya Municipal Subway - Tsurumai Line
  -  -  -  
Nagoya Municipal Subway - Sakura-dōri Line
  -

Highways
Mei-Nikan Expressway 
National Route 153 
National Route 302

References

External links